Edward F. Mertz (August 15, 1890 - May 1970) was a member of the Wisconsin State Assembly.

Biography
Mertz was born on August 15, 1890 in Milwaukee, Wisconsin, where he attended a parochial school. During World War I, he served in the United States Army.

Political career
Mertz was first elected to the Assembly in 1948 for the 16th Milwaukee District, serving from in total from 1949 to 1957. He represented the 9th Milwaukee district from 1963 to 1965. Additionally, he was a delegate to the 1952 Democratic National Convention. Mertz died in May 1970.

References

1890 births
1970 deaths
Politicians from Milwaukee
Democratic Party members of the Wisconsin State Assembly
Military personnel from Milwaukee
United States Army personnel of World War I